Rolling Stock was a newspaper of ideas and a chronicler of the 1980s published in Boulder, Colorado by Ed Dorn and Jennifer Dunbar Dorn. The paper had a regional motif, but featured correspondents covering the world, including Woody Haut on Labor, John Daley on Law, Roger Echo-Hawk on Native American Affairs, Nick Sedgwick on Golf, Stan Brakhage on Film, Jane Brakhage on Lump Gulch, Dick Dillof in Montana, Lucía Berlin in California, Tom Raworth, London and Cambridge, Fielding Dawson, New York City; Jeremy Prynne, English Letters, Marilyn Krysl in China, James Inskeep, Southern Colorado, Tom Clark, Southern California, and Bob Lewis, Akron, Ohio and Abroad. 

Graphics were regularly supplied by Tom Clark, John Dunbar and Ann Mikolowski among many others.

External links
Jennifer Dorn Dunbar essay on Rolling Stock: A Chronicle of the 80's

Defunct newspapers published in Colorado
Mass media in Boulder, Colorado